The Okamura N-52 is a low-wing, side-by-side seating sport aircraft, that was designed in Japan by students.

Development
The N-52 Started as a design experiment at Nihon University. Three test airframes were funded by Asahi Press for analysis.

Design
The N-52 is powered by a Continental A-65 engine. The aircraft features a single open cockpit with side-by-side seating and a taildragger landing gear. The aircraft was designed to accommodate up to  engines. Controllability with a  engine was considered sluggish.

Specifications (Okamura N-52)

See also

References

Homebuilt aircraft